Somayeh Mohammadi, born (8 September 1980), is an Iranian woman and a member of the Mujahedin-e Khalq (MEK). She has received media coverage concerning controversy about her membership in the MEK.

According to her father, Mostafa Mohammedi, a former MEK member, Somayeh is being held hostage by MEK, but she publicly denies these claims and has filed a lawsuit against him. Somayeh claims that her father is an undercover agent of Iran. According to Somayeh, she joined the MEK voluntarily in 1998 "seeking freedom and democracy for Iran."

Somayeh lives in MEK headquarters , previously in Iraq and now in Albania. She emigrated from Iran to Canada with her family in 1994. Since 1997, her parents claim to have been attempting to bring her home. Somayeh had gone to Iraq to visit Camp Ashraf in 1997, never returning to Canada. According to her father, the MEK kidnapped his daughter from Canada when she was a teenager, when they convinced him to allow his daughter for a two-week training camp in Iraq, but she and her brother never returned. According to The Guardian, "the MEK insists Somayeh does not wish to leave the camp, and released her letter accusing her father of working for Iranian intelligence." According to Somayeh Mohammadi's lawyer, the Albanian prosecution rejected to take the case because Somayeh said she was not being kept in the MEK against her will. The lawyer also said that she and her family had been threatened by unknown people online for representing Somayeh Mohammadi.

Membership in MEK
Somayeh Mohammadi left Canada with her parents when she was 15 years old to Iraq to Camp Ashraf, Iraq in 1997. Mostafa Mohammadi, Somayeh's father, said a woman from the organization offered his daughter a two-week training camp at Camp Ashraf. Mostafa was an MEK member at the time, as was usually collecting donations for the MEK. He believed Somayeh lives under poor conditions and that the MEK tortured her. A letter wrote on her behalf to the Albanian Interior Minister asked to forbid her father to stay in Albania. She said his presence is a "security problem" for other members of the MEK.

In one video, Somayeh appeared in an interview by two Albanian journalist who were one of the only people granted access to see her. Somayeh is only allowed to speak to others while indoor and under MEK supervision. She conducted the interview wearing an MEK militant uniform. She accused her father of being an Iranian intelligence agent. In the interview, she claimed that she can go everywhere she wants but just chooses not to. The MEK have stated that Somayeh does not like to leave Camp Ashraf, but Somayeh's parents have asked to visit their daughter outside the camp and without her MEK supervisors. Mohamadi's family state that Somayeh is never allowed to leave the camp and is imprisoned, forced to make videotaped announcements through threats of torture. Somayeh's mother said: "Somayeh is a shy girl. I knew that she wants to leave but she is under pressure because the MEK member and officer have threatened her."

On 17 October 2013, a letter was sent by Somayeh to Canadian authorities while in was asking them to return her to Canada again, as soon as possible, but she didn't have a Canadian passport anymore and it was impossible to help her. Her father said, "Who knows what the MEK member did to her". After some time, a PDF book named "The End Of A Conspiracy" was released in her name. She changed her mind according the book and announced that she wishes to remain with the MEK.

She is one of about 2000-3000 members of the Mujahedin-e Khalq who are living inside the groups' camp, named Ashraf 3, in outside the city of Durrës.

Background
Mostafa Mohamadi, Somayeh's father moved to Canada in 1994 to seek political asylum. Mostafa and Robabe Mohammadi claim they have trying to get their daughter back from the MEK since 1997. According to Somayeh's parents, they traveled from their home in Canada to Paris, Jordan, Iraq and now Albania to visit their daughter and get her back from the MEK. During their trip to Albania, they claim they were followed by two Albanian intelligence agents. Mostafa stated, "We are not working against any group or country. We are only trying to visit our daughter outside the MEK camp. She can choose freely to stay in camp or come back to her home in Canada with us." He added, the MEK group ‘kidnapped’ his daughter and his son from Canada in 1997. She was only 17 and traveled to Iraq to visit Ashraf camp. But Somayeh said that she voluntarily left Canada in 1998 for joining the MEK like another Iranian. Somayeh published a letter which she accused her father of being an Iranian intelligence agent. Somayeh's mother believes her daughter is a shy girl, and the MEK member have threaten people like her. If she can choose freely, she will leave the camp and MEK.

Reaction
The MEK has published a letter on Albanian media 2018, introducing Somayeh as its author. The letter introduces Somyaeh's father as an Iranian intelligence agent. Recently Somayeh announced in a video interview inside the MEK that she wants to be a member of the group. The Mohammadis have responded with open letters to their daughter and to Albanian politicians, asking for a meeting with their daughter.

As Somayeh says, she has published her whole story in a book in Persian and English to describe her father's efforts to abuse her, as well as she accuses her father to play the role as an undercover Iranian agent in the Ashraf and Liberty camp killings in Iraq.

Morteza Payeshenas has directed a documentary film called “An Unfinished Film for My Daughter, Somayeh” (2014) about her story. It was aired by the Islamic Republic of Iran Broadcasting.

Somayeh Mohammadi said that the videos and photos used in the documentary were "given to the regime’s intelligence to make a documentary against PMOI."

References

1980 births
Living people
Iranian refugees
Applicants for refugee status in Canada
Iranian emigrants to Canada
People with acquired Canadian citizenship
People's Mojahedin Organization of Iran members
Iranian expatriates in Iraq
Canadian expatriates in Iraq